Marcus Anthony Poscha (born 10 October 1996) is an English footballer who plays as a defender for Curzon Ashton.

Career

Bury

Born in Rochdale, Greater Manchester, Poscha joined the youth system of Bury. In the 2013–14 season he played in every youth team game, making 28 appearances as the side reached the Lancashire FA Senior Cup final. He made his professional debut on 3 May 2014, coming on as a substitute for Scott Burgess in the second half of the 0–0 draw with Morecambe. In February 2015, Poscha signed his first professional contract with the club.

However, Poscha failed to make a breakthrough at Bury and was loaned out to Ramsbottom United, where he made ten appearances and scored once for the side. In March 2016, Poscha was loaned out again to Stockport County and went on to make three appearances during his time there.

At the end of the 2015–16 season, Poscha was released by the club.

Crewe Alexandra

After trials for various clubs over the summer, Poscha signed a deal with Crewe Alexandra until the end of the season on 9 September 2016.

However, Poscha was sent straight to the U23 squad, where he played for the most of the season. At the end of the 2016–2017, without making a single appearance for the Crewe Alexandra first team, he was released by the club.

Non-League
Following his release from Crewe, he signed for Northern Premier League Division One North side Ramsbottom United in September 2017, where he had previously had a loan spell. He only spent a month at the club, then he moved up a division to play for Northern Premier League Premier Division side Halesowen Town. He spent the remainder of the campaign with Halesowen before dropping down a division again to play for Northern Premier League Division One West side Colne. In August 2020, he stepped up two divisions to sign for National League North side Curzon Ashton, joining manager Steve Cunningham who had also managed him at Colne. In September 2020, he had a short loan spell at Northern Premier League Division One West side Clitheroe.

Career statistics

References

External links

1996 births
Living people
English footballers
Footballers from Rochdale
Association football midfielders
Bury F.C. players
Stockport County F.C. players
Crewe Alexandra F.C. players
Ramsbottom United F.C. players
Halesowen Town F.C. players
Colne F.C. players
Curzon Ashton F.C. players
Clitheroe F.C. players
English Football League players
National League (English football) players
Northern Premier League players